The Waxiang people are an unrecognized ethnic group living along the Yuanjiang River in western Hunan, China. They call themselves Huaxiang people (IPA::/wa33 ɕioŋ55/) and they speak Waxiang Chinese. Compared to the Han, Miao and Tujia people of the region, they are very different in terms of clothing, food, living, farming and other cultural norms.

Population and distribution
The Waxiang people are an unrecognized ethnic group in China, with a population of about 400,000. Currently, the views of scholars and the Chinese government are usually that Waxiang Chinese, the main language used by Waxiang people, is in the Mandarin subdivision of the Chinese language. The Waxiang people are usually situated in the Hunan province of China.

Ethnic group designation
Many of the Waxiang people are designated as Miao, while some are designated as Tujia or Han. However, no matter the designated ethnic group, most of them have recognition to the Waxiang ethnic group, and hope to edit the ethnic group category, in addition to establishing a Waxiang autonomous region.

According to a study on their physical characteristics, the Waxiang were found to be closest related to the Derung and Lahu people.

Notable people
Song Zuying: mother is Miao, father is Waxiang.

References

Subgroups of the Han Chinese
Yuanling County
Ethnic groups in China